The Tabernacle Baptist Church is located at 801 8th Street, West Palm Beach, Florida. It was founded in 1893 as Mount Olive Baptist Church. From 1894 to 1896, it housed the first public school for blacks in Palm Beach County. The current building was built in 1925 in the neo-Romanesque Revival style.

References 

Baptist churches in Florida
African-American churches
Schools in Palm Beach County, Florida
Churches in Palm Beach County, Florida
Historically segregated African-American schools in Florida
1893 establishments in Florida